Eva Cecilia Petersén (5 December 1923 – 5 January 2012) was a Swedish diver. She competed in the women's 10 metre platform event at the 1948 Summer Olympics.

References

External links
 

1923 births
2012 deaths
Swedish female divers
Olympic divers of Sweden
Divers at the 1948 Summer Olympics
Sportspeople from Gotland County